IdiomaX LLC is a translation software company that has been offering translation products and services for the international market since 1996.

History 
IdiomaX was established in 1996. Its team of specialists in natural language and applied computing creates software products that go beyond word-by-word translation, instead recognizing grammatical rule, patterns, and idiomatic expressions to deliver more accurate language translations.

In 1998, after launching the IdiomaX Translator, IdiomaX developed a dedicated PC Translator for Garzanti (between Italian and the main EU languages) that was distributed directly by Garzanti in Italian bookstores for several years.

In 2005, IdiomaX started to sell on the Italian market with the IdiomaX brand “Traduttore Plurilingue IdiomaX” distributed by DLI Multimedia.

Starting from 2001, IdiomaX distributed its full range of products internationally via the website www.idiomax.com and via on-line distributors.

IdiomaX Products 
IdiomaX offers translation products for Home & Home Office, Small Business & Corporates, Mobile Phones, Schools & Government and Mobile Networks or Mobile Manufacturers.

The software is available for:
 Desktop Computers (with Windows OS)
 PDAs or Mobile Phones (with Symbian S60 or Windows Mobile)
 Corporate Servers
 Mobile Networks

IdiomaX Services 
IdiomaX offers the following online translation services in the website:
 Text Translation
 Verb Conjugation
 Dictionary Look-up

Current Language Coverage 
IdiomaX translation engine works with the following language pairs:
 English into/from Spanish
 English into/from Italian
 English into/from French
 Spanish into/from Italian
 Spanish into/from French
 Italian into/from French
 Italian into/from German

External links 
 

Machine translation